Lingdong District is a district of the city of Shuangyashan, Heilongjiang province, in the People's Republic of China.

Administrative divisions 
Lingdong District is divided into 6 subdistricts and 1 township. 
6 subdistricts
 Zhongshan, Beishan, Nanshan, Dongshan, Zhongxin, Xishan
1 town
 Zhangsheng

Notes and references 

Lingdong
Shuangyashan